Bọ̀lọ̀jọ̀ is an African dancing and popular musical style among the Yewa Yoruba clans situated in the western regions of Ogun State, Nigeria and other closely linked Yoruba subgroups in the nearby Plateau Department of  Benin.

It is mostly featured in festivals, parties and in Gelede shows.

Beninese singer Zeynab Habib is also known for her popular recreation of Bolojo dances.

References

Yoruba culture
African dances